Bryan Christopher Barker (born June 28, 1964) is a former American football punter in the National Football League (NFL).

Barker last played for the St. Louis Rams in 2005.  Barker has previously played with the Kansas City Chiefs, the Philadelphia Eagles, the Jacksonville Jaguars, the Washington Redskins, and the Green Bay Packers.

On November 28, 2002, during week 13 of the NFL season against the Dallas Cowboys, Barker experienced a severely broken nose, a subdural hematoma, while playing in a nationally televised game.

Aaron Schatz of statistics site Football Outsiders noted a punt Barker kicked "in 1999 that was just ridiculous, far past any baseline I had ever created. In Week 5, on the road against the Jets, [Barker] punted the ball from the Jaguars' own 5-yard line to the Jets' 12-yard line, an 83-yard punt

References

External links
St. Louis Rams bio (2005)

1964 births
Living people
American Conference Pro Bowl players
American football punters
Green Bay Packers players
Jacksonville Jaguars players
Kansas City Chiefs players
Miramonte High School alumni
Philadelphia Eagles players
Players of American football from California
Players of American football from Jacksonville, Florida
People from Jacksonville Beach, Florida
People from Orinda, California
Santa Clara Broncos football players
Sportspeople from the San Francisco Bay Area
St. Louis Rams players
Washington Redskins players